Borns Glacier is a glacier immediately west of Mount Coates, flowing north from the Kukri Hills of Victoria Land. It was charted by the British Antarctic Expedition under R. F. Scott, 1910–13, and named by the Advisory Committee on Antarctic Names for Harold W. Borns, Jr., United States Antarctic Research Program geologist who made investigations in the area during 1960–61.

References
 

Glaciers of McMurdo Dry Valleys